Paul Jonathan Mardon (born 14 September 1969) is a former professional footballer who made 270 appearances in the Football League playing as a central defender. Mardon also earned one cap for the Wales national team against Germany in October 1995.

Career
Born in Bristol, Mardon began his professional career in 1987 with hometown club Bristol City. He scored once for the club, at the age of 19, away to Nottingham Forest in the semi-final of the League Cup on 15 February 1989. He also played for Doncaster Rovers, Birmingham City, West Bromwich Albion, Oldham Athletic, Plymouth Argyle and Wrexham, before retiring due to injury in 2001.

References

1969 births
Living people
Footballers from Bristol
Welsh footballers
Wales international footballers
Association football defenders
Bristol City F.C. players
Doncaster Rovers F.C. players
Birmingham City F.C. players
West Bromwich Albion F.C. players
Oldham Athletic A.F.C. players
Plymouth Argyle F.C. players
Wrexham A.F.C. players
English Football League players